Lambretta was a Swedish pop rock band that existed from 1993 till 2005.

Biography
The band started in 1993 but then without Sundblad doing the vocals, after some time she joined and they released their debut album Breakfast. After releasing two more albums Sundblad announced in late 2005 she was going to do a solo record. This caused the remaining members of Lambretta to stop and form a new band called Psych Onation.

Members
 Linda Sundblad - vocals
 Klas Edmundsson - guitar
 Petter Lantz - bass
 Marcus Nowak - drums

Former members
 Anders Eliasson
 Tomas Persic

Discography

Albums

Singles

References

External links
Official site now closed (see Archive.org for the web site's history)
 Official Myspace-Seite
 Portrait at laut.de
 Music Brainz Profile

Musical groups established in 1993
Swedish hard rock musical groups
Musical groups disestablished in 2005
1993 establishments in Sweden